The England cricket team toured South Africa from December 2019 to February 2020 to play four Tests, three One Day Internationals (ODIs) and three Twenty20 International (T20I) matches. The Test series formed part of the inaugural 2019–2021 ICC World Test Championship. Cricket South Africa confirmed the fixtures for the tour in May 2019.

In September 2019, Cricket South Africa raised concerns about hosting the New Year's Test match at the Newlands Cricket Ground, with regards to financial issues around Western Province Cricket Association's affairs. The following month, Cricket South Africa confirmed that the venue would host the Test match as planned. Ahead of the Test series, South Africa's Vernon Philander announced that the series would be his last before retiring from international cricket. In the first Test, England's James Anderson became the ninth cricketer to play in 150 Test matches. The third Test of the series was England's 500th to be played overseas. England won the Test series 3–1, the first time that the England cricket team had won three Tests on a tour to South Africa since 1913–14. South Africa became the first team to be deducted  World Test Championship points, after a slow over-rate in the fourth Test.

For the One Day International series, Cricket South Africa appointed Quinton de Kock as the new captain of their ODI team, replacing Faf du Plessis. Du Plessis was also dropped from the ODI squad. Quinton de Kock was also named as South Africa's captain for the T20I series. The ODI series was drawn 1–1, after the second match was washed out. England won the T20I series 2–1. The 1,207 runs scored in the T20Is broke the record for the most runs scored in a three-match T20I series. The day after the final T20I match, Faf du Plessis announced that he had stepped down as the captain of South Africa's Test and T20I sides.

Squads

Ahead of the first Test match, several members of the England cricket team became ill with flu-like symptoms. As a result, Dom Bess and Craig Overton were called up to England's squad as cover. During the first Test, South Africa's Aiden Markram fractured his finger ruling him out of the rest of the series. Keegan Petersen was named as Markram's replacement in South Africa's Test squad. Prior to the second Test, Rory Burns suffered an ankle injury playing football and was ruled out of England's squad for the rest of the series. In January 2020, Pat Brown was ruled out of England's ODI and T20I squads, following a stress fracture to his lower back. England's James Anderson suffered a rib injury on the final day of the second Test, and was ruled out of the rest of the series. Craig Overton remained in England's Test squad as cover for Anderson. Before the third Test, England's Jack Leach flew home after suffering from sepsis. South Africa's Kagiso Rabada was banned from the fourth Test, after breaching the ICC code of conduct for his celebration after dismissing Joe Root in the third Test. England's Jofra Archer picked up an elbow injury during the Test series that eventually ruled him out of playing in the T20I matches. Saqib Mahmood was named as Archer's replacement in England's T20I squad. Ahead of the ODI series, Sisanda Magala was declared not to be fully fit, and was ruled out of South Africa's squad.

Tour matches

Two-day match: Cricket South Africa Invitation XI vs England

Three-day match: South Africa A vs England

One-day match: Cricket South Africa Invitation XI vs England

One-day match: Cricket South Africa Invitation XI vs England

Test series

1st Test

2nd Test

3rd Test

4th Test

ODI series

1st ODI

2nd ODI

3rd ODI

T20I series

1st T20I

2nd T20I

3rd T20I

Notes

References

External links
 Series home at ESPN Cricinfo

2019 in English cricket
2020 in English cricket
2019 in South African cricket
2020 in South African cricket
International cricket competitions in 2019–20
English cricket tours of South Africa